Micromus subanticus is a species of brown lacewing in the family Hemerobiidae. It is found in the Caribbean, Europe and Northern Asia (excluding China), Central America, and North America.

References

Further reading

 

Hemerobiiformia
Articles created by Qbugbot
Insects described in 1853